Isabelle Frances Daniels (later Holston; July 31, 1937 – September 8, 2017) was an American sprinter.

Daniels attended Tennessee State University, where she was part of their AAU champion relay team for 5 years. She took the silver in the 60 meters at the 1955 Pan American Games and was on the winning relay team.  She competed for the United States in the 1956 Summer Olympics held in Melbourne, Australia, where she won the bronze medal in the 4×100 metres with her teammates Mae Faggs, Margaret Matthews and Wilma Rudolph, in a race where all three teams beat the existing world record. She was initially placed third in the 100 meters, but was moved to fourth after photos of the finish were examined.

In 1958 she participated in a goodwill tour over the Soviet Union and Eastern Europe. She worked for many years as a physical education teacher and coach in Georgia, where she received numerous awards, including 1990 National Coach of the Year by the National High School Athletic Coaches Association. In 1987 she was inducted into the Georgia Sports Hall of Fame. In 1992 she was honored as the All-State Role Model; a documentary on her life was produced and broadcast in the halftime of the Georgia high school all-stars basketball game. She was also listed on a 1992 "Coaches Care Honor Roll" sponsored by Gatorade. In March 2006 she was inducted into the Hall of Fame of the Bob Hayes Invitational Track Meet in Jacksonville, Florida. Daniels died on September 8, 2017, at the age of 80. She was married to Rev. Sidney R. Holston; the couple had four children.

References

External links 
 

1937 births
2017 deaths
Sportspeople from Georgia (U.S. state)
People from Early County, Georgia
American female sprinters
Olympic bronze medalists for the United States in track and field
Athletes (track and field) at the 1956 Summer Olympics
Pan American Games medalists in athletics (track and field)
Athletes (track and field) at the 1955 Pan American Games
Athletes (track and field) at the 1959 Pan American Games
Tennessee State Lady Tigers track and field athletes
Medalists at the 1956 Summer Olympics
Pan American Games gold medalists for the United States
Pan American Games silver medalists for the United States
USA Outdoor Track and Field Championships winners
USA Indoor Track and Field Championships winners
Medalists at the 1955 Pan American Games
Medalists at the 1959 Pan American Games
Olympic female sprinters